Vander Iacovino (born 25 September 1965) is a Brazilian futsal coach and former player who is the manager of Liga Nacional de Futsal club Joinville. As a player Vander played as a winger for several Liga Futsal clubs and the Brazilian national futsal team. Vander is a father of three, and his youngest son Bruninho is also a Brazilian international futsal player.

References

External links
Liga Nacional de Futsal profile

1965 births
Living people
Brazilian men's futsal players